And the Summertime Pool Party is the fourth studio album by American rapper Pigeon John. It was released on Quannum Projects in 2006.

Reception
Dan Raper of PopMatters said, "this now-veteran MC has shown us an unabashedly good time, replete with hopeful, sunny melody and an essential, despite-it-all optimism truly in keeping with his nature."

Track listing

References

External links

2006 albums
Pigeon John albums
Quannum Projects albums